The 2020 season in Ecuadorian football included all the matches of the different national male and female teams, as well as the local club tournaments, and the participation of these in international competitions in which representatives of the country's teams had participated.

National teams

Ecuador national football team

Kits

2022 FIFA World Cup qualification

2020 Copa América

Tournament postponed for a year due to the COVID-19 pandemic in South America.

Ecuador national under-23 football team

2020 CONMEBOL Pre-Olympic Tournament

Group A

Ecuador women's national under-20 football team

2020 South American Under-20 Women's Football Championship

Group A

Ecuador women's national under-17 football team

2020 South American Under-17 Women's Football Championship

Tournament postponed due to the COVID-19 pandemic in South America.

CONMEBOL competitions

CONMEBOL Copa Libertadores

Qualifying stages

First qualifying stage

|}

Second qualifying stage

|}

Third qualifying stage

|}

Group stage

Group A

Group D

Group G

Knockout phase

Round of 16

|}

CONMEBOL Copa Sudamericana

First stage

|}

Second stage

|}

CONMEBOL Copa Libertadores Femenina

Group stage

Group A

Men's football

Serie A

First stage

Second stage

Aggregate table

Finals

Serie B

Segunda Categoría

Copa Ecuador
Tournament was cancelled due to the COVID-19 pandemic.

Supercopa de Ecuador

Women's football

Superliga Femenina

Finals

El Nacional won 4–1 on aggregate.

References 

2020 in Ecuadorian football
Football in Ecuador